The West Indies women's cricket team played the South Africa women's cricket team in January and February 2022. The tour consisted of four Women's One Day International (WODI) matches. Originally the tour was scheduled to consist of five WODIs and three Women's Twenty20 International (WT20I) matches, but a revised schedule was issued ahead of the 2022 Women's Cricket World Cup.

In January 2022, South Africa's captain Dane van Niekerk suffered a fractured ankle, ruling her out this series and the 2022 Women's Cricket World Cup. Lizelle Lee was also ruled out of South Africa's squad due to COVID-19, with Suné Luus named as the team's captain for the series in Lee's absence.

The first WODI match ended as a no result, with rain ending South Africa's run chase after 17.4 overs. Earlier, Deandra Dottin had made her career-best total, with 150 not out before the rain came. The second match finished in a tie, with the West Indies winning the Super Over. In the third match, Laura Wolvaardt scored a century as South Africa won by 96 runs to level the series. South Africa won the fourth and final match by six wickets to win the series 2–1. It was South Africa's fifth consecutive WODI series win, starting with a 3–0 win against New Zealand in January 2020.

Squads

Warm-up match

WODI series

1st WODI

2nd WODI

3rd WODI

4th WODI

Notes

References

External links
 Series home at ESPN Cricinfo

West Indies 2021-22
South Africa 2021-22
International cricket competitions in 2021–22
2022 in South African cricket
2022 in West Indian cricket
2022 in women's cricket